List of dams in Switzerland which are taller than 100 meters:

See also 
 List of lakes with a dam in Switzerland
 List of tallest dams in the world

External links 

http://www.swissdams.ch

 
Switzerland
Switzerland
Dams
Dams